The Bitter Spring Valley is a 13-mile (21 km) long valley located northeast of Las Vegas, Nevada on the west edge of Lake Mead, on the north-trending Overton Arm, (of the Virgin River, and Meadow Valley Wash).

The valley is a small valley basin located between two bordering mountain ranges. The Bitter Spring Wash exits east-northeastwards into the Overton Arm of Lake Mead, at Echo Bay, Nevada. The Valley of Fire State Park lies adjacent north, on the north side of the Muddy Mountains. An unimproved route, named Bitter Spring Trail traverses the Muddy Mountains and the valley from paved routes from Echo Bay to Valley of Fire Highway, and Interstate 15.

Description
The North Section drains southeastwards into two washes that meet the South Section. The washes in the South Section combine to flow east-northeast to Echo Bay, Overton Arm.

Access
North Shore Road, from Nevada State Route 564, Henderson, Nevada is the major southern route to Echo Bay, and the east region of Bitter Spring Valley; North Shore Road traverses the northeast sections of the Black Mountains, which border Lake Mead.

Valley of Fire Highway, from Interstate 15 can access a north route, from Overton Beach, Nevada, at the northeast junction of North Shore Road.

An unimproved route from Echo Bay traverses Bitter Spring Wash, Bitter Spring Valley, then the North Section of the valley, and traverses through the northwest of the Muddy Mountains to meet Valley of Fire Highway.

References

External links
Bitter Ridge, (approx. valley center), (lat-long.com), coordinates

Lake Mead
Valleys of Clark County, Nevada
Valleys of Nevada